Parc Michel-Chartrand, formerly known as the Parc régional de Longueuil, is a large park located in Longueuil, Quebec, Canada. It is located at 1895 Rue Adoncour in the borough of Le Vieux-Longueuil.

Its features include a marsh, three artificial lakes, a sundial, a playground, two pétanque terrains, a rest area with picnic tables, a slope for sledding, an ice rink and community gardens.

Originally known as the Base de plein air de Longueuil (opened in 1975), it was renamed as the Parc régional de Longueuil, and renamed again as Parc Michel-Chartrand by the city of Longueuil in June 2010, after Quebec union activist Michel Chartrand.

Until the mid 1980s, prior to the extension of the Boulevard Fernand-Lafontaine, the Chemin du Lac was open to through traffic between Longueuil and Boucherville.

See also
Boisé du Tremblay

References

Longueuil
Michel-Chartrand